Mary Denise Rand, MBE (née Bignal on 10 February 1940) is an English former track and field athlete.  She won the long jump at the 1964 Summer Olympics by breaking the world record, the first British female to win an Olympic gold medal in track and field. She remains the only Great Britain female athlete to win three medals in a single Games.

Early life 
Mary Rand is the daughter of Eric and Hilda Bignal.  She was born and grew up in Wells, Somerset, England.  At 16, Millfield School offered her an athletics scholarship. She excelled in all sports and won All-England Schools' titles. She was outstanding at high jump, long jump and hurdles. In 1956, she was a guest of the Olympic squad at a training camp in Brighton, where she beat Britain's best high jumpers.

Athletics career 
At 17, Rand set a British record of 4046 points in the pentathlon. She won a silver medal in the 1958 Commonwealth Games long jump and came fifth in the high jump. One month later she came seventh in the European pentathlon championship.

In the 1960 Olympics in Rome, she set a British record of 6.33m in the qualifying round of the long jump, which if repeated, would have won a silver in the final. In the final she fouled two of the three jumps and finished ninth. She also finished fourth in the 80m hurdles. She won a bronze medal in the European championship long jump in 1962.

At the 1964 Olympics in Tokyo, Rand set an Olympic record in the long jump in the qualifying rounds, jumping 6.52m.  In the final she beat the favourite, world record holder Tatyana Schelkanova of the USSR and Poland's Irena Kirszenstein. Her first jump of 6.59m was a British record. However, in the fifth round, on a wet runway with a headwind of 1.6 metres a second, she broke the world record, leaping 6.76m to take gold. Her record lasted four years until it was broken at altitude by Viorica Viscopoleanu in the subsequent Olympics.

Rand won silver medal in the pentathlon, her 5035 points putting her second in the all-time rankings. She was beaten to the gold by Irina Press, whose biological sex has been the subject of speculation. She also won a bronze as a member of the Great Britain team that finished third in the 4×100 metres relay.

Six days after Rand won the gold medal, her roommate Ann Packer won the 800 metres.  Packer said: "Mary was the most gifted athlete I ever saw. She was as good as athletes get, there has never been anything like her since. And I don't believe there ever will."

Rand was made a Member of the Order of the British Empire (MBE) in the 1965 New Year Honours for services to athletics and voted BBC Sports Personality of the Year for 1964.

After Tokyo, her training was less intensive, but she won a gold the long jump at the 1966 Commonwealth Games. Due to injury, she failed to make the 1968 British Olympic team and retired in September that year.

Rand also held the world record in the triple jump from 1959 to 1981; it was unofficial as a world record in the women's triple jump was not recognised by the International Association of Athletics Federations until 1990.

There is a plaque commemorating the world record long jump (6.76 metres) by Rand at the 1964 Olympic Games in the Market Place in Wells.  She was succeeded as Golden Girl of British athletics by her friend and London Olympiades club-mate, Lillian Board.

In 2009, Rand was inducted into the England Athletics Hall of Fame.

On 26 January 2012 Wells awarded her the Freedom of the City, following a campaign started by Wells resident Tony Williams.

Personal life 

Around 1960 Bignal dated Dutch decathlete Eef Kamerbeek. In 1961 she met rower Sid Rand. Three days after meeting she agreed to marry him and they married five weeks later. They had a daughter, Alison. The marriage lasted five years.

In December 1969, she married her second husband,  American Bill Toomey, the 1968 Olympics' decathlon champion. This marriage lasted 22 years and they had two daughters, Samantha and Sarah. She later married John Reese and lives with him in Atascadero, California, in the United States. She holds dual UK/US citizenship.

References

External links 

British Pathe film: Mary Bignal Rand 1961
British Pathe film: Home Town Cheers Mary Rand 1964
Grainy video of her receiving BBC Sportsview Personality of the Year Award 1964

1940 births
Living people
People from Wells, Somerset
English female long jumpers
British female long jumpers
British pentathletes
British female triple jumpers
English female triple jumpers
English female hurdlers
British female hurdlers
Olympic athletes of Great Britain
Olympic gold medallists for Great Britain
Athletes (track and field) at the 1960 Summer Olympics
Athletes (track and field) at the 1964 Summer Olympics
English Olympic medallists
Commonwealth Games medallists in athletics
Commonwealth Games gold medallists for England
Commonwealth Games silver medallists for England
Athletes (track and field) at the 1958 British Empire and Commonwealth Games
Athletes (track and field) at the 1966 British Empire and Commonwealth Games
World record setters in athletics (track and field)
European Athletics Championships medalists
Members of the Order of the British Empire
BBC Sports Personality of the Year winners
People educated at Millfield
Medalists at the 1964 Summer Olympics
Olympic silver medallists for Great Britain
Olympic bronze medallists for Great Britain
Olympic gold medalists in athletics (track and field)
Olympic silver medalists in athletics (track and field)
Olympic bronze medalists in athletics (track and field)
Olympic female pentathletes
Medallists at the 1966 British Empire and Commonwealth Games